Khizri Magomedovich Abakarov (born 28 June 1960, Yuzhno-Sukhokumsk, Dagestan Autonomous Soviet Socialist Republic) is a Russian political figure, deputy of the 8th State Duma of the Russian Federal Assembly. He started his political career in 1999 as a deputy assistant of Suleyman Kerimov. On 16 October 2018 he was appointed head of Derbent Town District. On 10 November 2020 he left his post to become the State Secretary of the Republic of Dagestan. Since 19 September 2021 he has served as a deputy of the State Duma.

From 2011 to 2013, he supervised the construction of Anzhi Arena (Kaspiysk, Dagestan).

On 24 March 2022, the United States Treasury sanctioned him in response to the 2022 Russian invasion of Ukraine. Abakarov has also been under New Zealand sanctions since May 3, 2022. Moreover, in September 2022, he was included in the list of Ukrainian sanctions.

Awards 
 Order of Friendship (2021)
 Order For Services to the Republic of Dagestan.

References

1960 births
Living people
United Russia politicians
21st-century Russian politicians
Eighth convocation members of the State Duma (Russian Federation)
Russian individuals subject to the U.S. Department of the Treasury sanctions